The Battle of Bayana or the Siege of Bayana was a military conflict between the Rajput Confederacy under Rana Sanga on one side and Afghans of Bayana under Nizam Khan and Mughal advance guard, led by Abdul Aziz on other side.

Background
Babur's advance towards Delhi and Sanga's expansion towards Agra made war inevitable between the two kings. Babur's hostility towards Sanga is mentioned in his memoirs, in one instance he accuses Rana Sanga of destroying Muslim control over 200 towns and displacing their ruling families. After his victory against the Lodi Empire, Babur wanted control of Bayana, which was an important fort to defend Agra against Sangas advance. The fort of Bayana was under Afghan chieftain Nizam Khan. By Babur's order, Ustad Ali Khan cast a monstrous cannon to bombard Bayana and other forts. Babur sent 2500 men along with Afghans under Nizam Khan's brother Alam Khan to take the fort of Bayana but numerical superior Nizam Khan sallied forth from the fort and defeated the mughal army and routed them. Since Rana Sanga was moving towards Babur, time was key and hence Babur called for announcement of Jihad against infidel Rana and asked the Afghan chieftains of Bayana, Dholpur and Gwalior to join him in the holy war. Most of the Afghan chieftains along with Nizam Khan of Bayana accepted Babur's proposal of accepting Jagir since they knew they did not stand chance against the military power of Rana and hence allied with Babur.

Battle and aftermath
Sanga besieged the fortress of Bayana in an organized manner. Sanga divided his army in four parts and put his trusted nobles in front. An attempt by the garrison to sally forth and fight ended in rout of besieged army and several officers of distinction were killed or wounded. The besieged lost morale and surrendered the fort to Rana. Babur sent an army under Abdul Aziz to prevent Rana from advancing, but the Mughals were defeated and scattered by the Rajputs under Rana Sanga. The defeat at Bayana further demoralised the Mughal forces and allowed Rana Sanga to safely march towards Khanwa (thirty-seven kilometres west of Agra), leading to the Battle of Khanwa.

Historian G.N. Sharma notes that: "Though Babur and the Mughal historians have not attached much importance to the battle of Bayana, it stands out as a last great triumph in the chequered career of Rana Sanga in whose hands now lay the forts of Chittor, Ranthambore, Kandar and Bayana, the key points of central Hindustan. The short and sharp encounters that the Mughals had to face at the hands of the Rajputs on this occasion, in which they had been severely handled sent a thrill of terror and discouragement in the Mughal army."

References

Bayana
Bayana
Bayana
Mewar
History of Rajasthan
Bayana
1527 in India